Fabritius Cocci (died October, 1606) was a Roman Catholic prelate who served as Bishop of Vulturara e Montecorvino (1606).

Biography
On 27 Feb 1606, Fabritius Cocci was appointed during the papacy of Pope Paul V as Bishop of Vulturara e Montecorvino. He served as Bishop of Vulturara e Montecorvino until his death in Oct 1606.

See also
Catholic Church in Italy

References

External links and additional sources 
 (for Chronology of Bishops) 
 (for Chronology of Bishops) 

17th-century Italian Roman Catholic bishops
1606 deaths
Bishops appointed by Pope Paul V